In the Eye of the Storm is the fifth album by American southern rock band Outlaws, released in 1979. It is the last album with bassist Harvey Dalton Arnold. Monte Yoho would soon leave the band but return for future releases.

Track listing 
"Lights Are On but Nobody's Home" (Rhodes) – 3:29
"Miracle Man" (Elvis Costello) – 3:46
"Blueswater" (Jones) – 3:07
"Comin' Home" (Jones) – 4:09
"I'll Be Leaving Soon" (Jones) – 4:43
"Too Long Without Her" (Thomasson) – 4:54
"It's All Right" (Thomasson) – 3:41
"(Com' On) Dance with Me" (Arnold, Jones, Thomasson) – 2:39
"Long Gone" (Salem) – 4:30

Personnel 
Harvey Dalton Arnold – bass, vocals
David Dix – percussion, drums
Billy Jones – guitar, vocals
Freddie Salem – guitar, vocals
Hughie Thomasson – guitar, vocals
Monte Yoho – drums

Production
Producer: Johnny Sandlin
Mastering Engineer: George Marino
Engineer: David Gottlieb
Recorded at Quadradial Cinema Recording Studios, North Miami, Florida

Charts

References 

Outlaws (band) albums
1979 albums
Arista Records albums